Kościan railway station is a railway station serving the town of Kościan, in the Greater Poland Voivodeship, Poland. The station opened in 1856 and is located on the Wrocław–Poznań railway. The train services are operated by PKP and Przewozy Regionalne.

Train services
The station is served by the following services:

Intercity services Swinoujscie - Szczecin - Stargard - Krzyz - Poznan - Leszno - Wroclaw - Opole - Katowice - Krakow - Rzeszow - Przemysl
Intercity services Gorzow Wielkopolski - Krzyz - Poznan - Leszno - Wroclaw - Opole - Katowice - Krakow
Intercity services Slupsk - Koszalin / Kolobrzeg - Pila - Poznan - Wroclaw - Opole - Katowice
Intercity services Slupsk - Koszalin / Kolobrzeg - Pila - Poznan - Wroclaw - Opole - Czestochowa - Krakow - Rzeszow - Zamosc/Przemysl
Intercity services Slupsk - Koszalin / Kolobrzeg - Pila - Poznan - Wroclaw - Opole - Bielsko-Biala
Intercity services Gdynia - Gdansk - Bydgoszcz - Poznan - Leszno - Wroclaw - Opole - Katowice
Intercity services Bialystok - Elk - Olsztyn - Ilawa - Torun - Poznan - Leszno - Wroclaw
Regional services (R) Poznan - Koscian - Leszno - Zmigrod - Wroclaw

References

 This article is based upon a translation of the Polish language version as of December 2016.

External links

Railway stations in Poland opened in 1856
Railway stations in Greater Poland Voivodeship
Leszno County